Sergei Viktorovich Savchenkov (born 1 January 1955) is a Russian professional football coach and a former player.

Club career
As a player, he made his debut in the Soviet First League in 1977 for FC Kuzbass Kemerovo.

Personal life
His son Anton Savchenkov is a professional footballer.

Honours
 Soviet Top League runner-up: 1983.

References

1955 births
People from Lyudinovsky District
Living people
Soviet footballers
Association football defenders
Soviet Top League players
FC Fakel Voronezh players
FC Spartak Moscow players
Soviet football managers
Russian football managers
FC Fakel Voronezh managers
FC Baltika Kaliningrad managers
Russian Premier League managers
FC Metallurg Lipetsk managers
FK Atlantas managers
Russian expatriate football managers
Expatriate football managers in Lithuania
FC Dynamo Saint Petersburg players
Sportspeople from Kaluga Oblast